The 2011 Morocco Tennis Tour – Marrakech was a professional tennis tournament played on clay courts. It was the fifth edition of the tournament which is part of the 2011 ATP Challenger Tour. It took place in Marrakech, Morocco between 21 and 27 March 2011.

ATP entrants

Seeds

 Rankings are as of March 7, 2011.

Other entrants
The following players received wildcards into the singles main draw:
  Anas Fattar
  Hicham Khaddari
  Talal Ouahabi
  Mohamed Safwat

The following players received entry from the qualifying draw:
  Nicolas Devilder
  Malek Jaziri
  Christian Lindell
  Lamine Ouahab

Champions

Singles

 Rui Machado def.  Maxime Teixeira, 6–3, 6–7(7), 6–4

Doubles

 Peter Luczak /  Alessandro Motti def.  James Cerretani /  Adil Shamasdin, 7–6(5), 7–6(3)

External links
Official Website
ITF Search 
ATP official site

Marrakech
2011